Coscojahuarina (possibly from Quechua qusqu boundary stone; nucleus; navel; heap of earth and stones; bed, dry bed of a lake, Qusqu Cusco (a city), qhawarina, qhawana viewpoint) is a  mountain in the eastern extensions of the Urubamba  mountain range in the Andes of Peru. It is located in the Cusco Region, Calca Province, Calca District. It lies south of Llamayojcasa and west of the village of Totora.

References 

Mountains of Peru
Mountains of Cusco Region